Sarah Joy Brown, sometimes credited simply as Sarah Brown (born February 18, 1975), is an American actress.  She is perhaps best known for originating the role of Carly Corinthos on the American daytime drama General Hospital from 1996 to 2001. For the role, she won three Daytime Emmy Awards. In 2008, she returned to General Hospital in a different role, Claudia Zacchara. She exited General Hospital once again in 2009 and began appearing on The Bold and the Beautiful in the newly created role of Aggie Jones.

Brown appeared as Madison James on Days of Our Lives from October 2011 until the character's death in August 2012.

Early life and career
Brown was born in Eureka, California to parents David and Pamela Brown. She attended the Los Angeles County High School for the Arts as a theatre major. Her acting career began at the age of 19, when she was cast as Kaitlin Star on Saban's syndicated action adventure science fantasy series VR Troopers. In 1996, she made a guest appearance in a 3-part episode of Power Rangers Zeo playing Heather Thompson, a girl who has a crush on the Red Ranger's secret identity, Tommy Oliver, but it never led anywhere. An article in FOX Kids Magazine claimed a member of the VR Troopers cast would be quitting the series to become a part of the Power Rangers cast; however, the aforementioned Zeo three-parter and Brad Hawkins voicing the Gold Ranger prior to the return of Austin St. John as Jason Lee Scott is the closest anything like this ever came to happening.

In April 1996, Brown originated the role Carly Corinthos on the American ABC soap opera General Hospital. Brown "quickly became an overnight sensation" and received three Daytime Emmy Awards for her portrayal of Carly. She won for Outstanding Younger Actress in 1997 and 1998, was nominated in 1999, and won again for Outstanding Supporting Actress in 2000. In 2010, she received her first Daytime Emmy nomination in the Lead Actress category for her work as Claudia Zacchara. Brown appeared on the cover of Soap Opera Digest 19 times during her run in the role, and won two Soap Opera Digest Awards in 1998 (Younger Lead Actress) and 2000 (Favorite Actress). She departed the series in April 2001.

After leaving General Hospital, Brown guest-starred on several television series, including Crossing Jordan, Strong Medicine and Without a Trace. She returned to daytime in the role of Julia Morrisey Larrabee on As the World Turns from August 2004 to March 2005, in which she appeared in 109 episodes. In 2004, Brown played the lead role of Kate Vignatti in the fact-based television movie The Perfect Husband: The Laci Peterson Story. She became a regular on the popular CBS crime drama Cold Case in the fall of 2005 but was let go after only a few months (she appeared in five episodes) with the series. In 2006, she starred in her first feature film, the comedy, Big Momma's House 2 and appeared in an episode of Monk the same year. Brown was also seen in the third season episode 12  of The Closer and on a 2007 episode of the Fox police drama K-Ville.

Brown returned to General Hospital on January 31, 2008, in the role of Claudia Zacchara. She announced on her Twitter September 16, 2009 that she would be leaving General Hospital in mid October 2009. Brown also announced on her Twitter account that she would be making an appearance on ABC's Castle.

In 2011, she had a supporting role in a Tracy J Trost film entitled The Lamp (All Things are Possible If You Just Believe). It is based on a novel by Jim Stovall. In July 2011, numerous soap outlets confirmed that Brown would join the cast of Days of Our Lives as Madison James, a successful business woman. Her first appearance was October 4, 2011. In April 2012, it was announced that Brown had been let go from the series along with many other cast members.

In 2014, Brown played Massachusetts State Representative Katherine "Kate" Wesley in the soap opera web series Beacon Hill. She was nominated for a 2015 Daytime Emmy Award for Outstanding Performer in a New Approaches Drama Series, and won a 2015 Indie Series Award for Best Lead Actress (Drama) for the role.

Personal life
Brown is a practicing convert to Judaism. She has one daughter, Jordan Alexandra Judith Levy (b. July 20, 1998), whose father is Brown's ex-fiancé, Israeli composer Shuki Levy (a former executive producer on VR Troopers and the Power Rangers franchise). Brown has been diagnosed with  Celiac Disease.

Filmography

Film

Television

Video games

See also
 List of people diagnosed with coeliac disease

References

External links

Sarah Brown profile – Soaps.com
Sarah Brown profile – SoapOperaDigest.com
Official site

1975 births
20th-century American actresses
21st-century American actresses
Actresses from California
American film actresses
American soap opera actresses
American television actresses
Converts to Judaism
Daytime Emmy Award for Outstanding Supporting Actress in a Drama Series winners
Daytime Emmy Award for Outstanding Younger Actress in a Drama Series winners
Jewish American actresses
Living people
Los Angeles County High School for the Arts alumni
People from Eureka, California
21st-century American Jews